

Stephanie Pakrul (born September 9, 1982), also known as StephTheGeek, is an internet personality.

Biography
Pakrul is from Mississauga, Ontario. She studied as an information technology student at Ryerson University in Toronto and earned a master's degree from the University of California, Berkeley.

Pakrul began developing webpages at around the age of 15 and started her personal site a few years later, in 2001, as a small personal website. The site has since become a blog, sharing many personal details of her life, including music, relationships, gadgetry, and sexuality.

In 2003, Pakrul self-published a crowdfunded album, Not a Victim. Feminist blog The F-Word praised Not a Victim, writing: "Beautifully crafted songs with wonderful melodies, emotional lyrics and understated piano/guitar accompaniment make this a stand-out debut."

Pakrul has been featured on TechTV, Canadian Broadcasting Corporation's Street Cents, MTV Live, and in Young Entrepreneur, Cosmogirl, and several newspapers. Her interests include consumer rights, sex work, and increasing efficiency in everyday life through innovative uses of technology. She was also a member of Industry Canada's SchoolNet Youth Advisory Board.

As of 2016, Pakrul lives in San Francisco.

See also
 Geek chic

References

Further reading

External links
 
 Official website  2003 via the Internet Archive
 
 

Canadian bloggers
People from San Francisco
People from Mississauga
1982 births
Living people